Ricardo Mion Varella Costa (born June 17, 1982) is a Brazilian footballer. His last team was Deportivo Saprissa, from Costa Rica where he played as a striker.

Career 
He started his career in S.C. Corinthias Paulista. After he played in Paulista he was transferred to OSK in Sweden. After two and a half seasons, and over 50 matches for the club, he left for Spanish football, playing for C.D. Leganes. In the 2006–07 season he signed a contract with F.C. Winterthur of Swiss Challenge League. After that, he signed a one-year contract with Grêmio Barueri in July 2007, but in January of the following year he was transferred to Veria F.C., where he played in the top division of Greece. In 2009, he joined Korean team Daejeon Citizen but returned to Brazil due to personal problems. He played with ABC-RN when the club won the state league Campeonato Potiguar de Futebol in May 2010. In July 2010 he moved for Maltese pitches joining Tarxien Rainbows F.C. After two seasons, he moved to Costa Rican giants Deportivo Saprissa.

ÖSK 

Joining his teammates at August 2003, Ricardo played over 50 matches with the club's shirt and scored 11 goals with 16 assists on his records during the 2003, 2004 and 2005 seasons. The technical football style of the Brazilian/Italian player was appreciated from the club's fans since his first appearances.

Tarxien Rainbows 

In July 2010, it was announced that Ricardo had signed a contract with Maltese Premier League club Tarxien Rainbows where he played alongside his former Corinthians teammate Everton.
On the Rainbows, he played 55 official matches, scored 22 goals with 21 assists on his records.

Deportivo Saprissa 

Ricardo moved to Saprissa for the Winter Tournament (Torneo de Invierno) playing 4 matches from start and scoring 3 goals with 4 assists on his records.
His first goal was against Puntarenas FC when, after being away from the team for a month due to an immigration process delay, he entered as a substitute and at the 88th minute, headed the ball home after a perfect corner by Jose Carlos Cancela and scored the winning goal. The match finished 2–1.
His second goal was against Uruguay FC, with a hard raising shot at the second half scoring the 2–0.
He was again the hero when he entered at the 86th minute and scored the winning goal against San Carlos at the National Stadium of Costa Rica.
He scored a very nice kick-over goal (chilena) when playing the farewell match of one of Saprissa icons, Alonso Solis. It was the first of the two goals he scored that night.

External links 
 CBF 
 

1982 births
Living people
Brazilian footballers
Brazilian expatriate footballers
Association football forwards
Footballers from São Paulo
Allsvenskan players
Liga FPD players
Sport Club Corinthians Paulista players
Grêmio Barueri Futebol players
Paulista Futebol Clube players
Örebro SK players
CD Leganés players
FC Winterthur players
Veria F.C. players
Daejeon Hana Citizen FC players
ABC Futebol Clube players
Tarxien Rainbows F.C. players
Deportivo Saprissa players
Expatriate footballers in South Korea
K League 1 players
Brazilian expatriate sportspeople in South Korea
Expatriate footballers in Sweden
Expatriate footballers in Spain
Expatriate footballers in Switzerland
Expatriate footballers in Greece
Expatriate footballers in Malta
Expatriate footballers in Costa Rica